Longispora urticae is a Gram-positive and aerobic bacterium from the genus Longispora which has been isolated from rhizospheric soil from the plant Urtica urens from Anshan, China.

References

External links
Type strain of Longispora urticae at BacDive -  the Bacterial Diversity Metadatabase

Micromonosporaceae
Bacteria described in 2017